Capurro is a populated centre in San José Department of southern Uruguay.

Geography
Its nearest populated centre is 18 de Julio (Pueblo Nuevo),  to the east.

Population
In 2011 Capurro had a population of 517.
 
Source: Instituto Nacional de Estadística de Uruguay

Places of worship
 Christ the Redeemer Parish Church (Roman Catholic)

References

External links
INE map of Capurro

Populated places in the San José Department